Seetoh Kok Fye (born 1962), better known as KF Seetoh, is a Singaporean food critic, author, restauranteur, and television personality. 

The fourth of five children, Seetoh attended St. Joseph's Institution and the Baharuddin Vocational Institute. Beginning in 1983, he worked as a photographer for local newspaper The Straits Times, but left in 1990 to establish his own photographic studio. In 1998, Seetoh and Lim Moh Cher founded Makansutra (a portmanteau combining "makan" and "sutra"), a food guide publisher dedicated to Asian cuisine.

In 2021, Seetoh collaborated with Urbanspace, a company managing food halls in the United States, to open a Singaporean hawker centre, near Times Square, New York, United States in 2022.

Accolades 
In 2008, Seetoh was awarded the Special Recognition Award by the Singapore Tourism Board at the Singapore Tourism Awards.

References

1962 births
21st-century Singaporean writers
Living people